Nanos may refer to:

 Nanos (beetle), a genus in the tribe Canthonini
 Nanos (plateau), a plateau in the Dinaric Alps, Slovenia
 Nanos, Vipava, a settlement in the Municipality of Vipava, Slovenia
 Nanos Research, a Canadian polling firm
 nanos, a gene responsible for axis specification in a number of organisms such as in Drosophila embryogenesis
 Nanos, an illegitimate homonym genus for ''Nanum (bicosoecid)

People with the surname
 Apostolos Nanos, Olympic archer
 George Peter Nanos, former director of the Los Alamos National Laboratory
 Nikita Nanos, founder of Nanos Research